Telling You, also known as Love Sucks, is a 1998 romantic comedy film directed by Robert DeFranco and starring Peter Facinelli, Jennifer Love Hewitt, Matthew Lillard, and Dash Mihok. It was distributed by Miramax. Its filming location finds place in North Hollywood. It was released on August 7, 1998.

Plot
Two college graduates find themselves back home in Long island stuck behind the counter of a pizza parlor and frustrated about their life's perspectives, while their friends move on, struggle to find a new direction for their lives.

Cast
 Peter Facinelli as Phil Fazzulo
 Jennifer Love Hewitt as Deb Freidman
 Matthew Lillard as Adam Ginesberg
 Dash Mihok as Dennis Nolan
 Andy Berman as Howard Gurtler
 Robert DeFranco as Steve Fagan
 Gary Wolf as John Foley
 Richard Libertini as Mr. P
 Gina Philips as Kristen Barrett
 Jennifer Jostyn as Beth Taylor
 Frank Medrano as Sal Lombardo
 Jensen Daggett as Susan
 Shanna Moakler as Cheryl Tangeray
 Charlotte Ayanna as Allison Fazio (as Charlotte Lopez)
 Marc Bossley as Tommy Spahn
 Stephanie Brown as Michelle Itzo
 Gerald Jennke as Michelle Itzo's Neighbor
 Michelle Burke as Kristen's Friend (as Michelle Thomas)
 Andrea Tiano as Maria (Sal's Sister)
 Mike Muldoon as Jerry (Sal's Brother-in-Law)
 Jack Rourke as Murph
 Rick Rossovich as McQueeney (uncredited)
 Jennie Garth as Amber (uncredited)
 Lorin Eric Salm as Lettuce Man
 John Bachelder as John Batchelder
 Stephen 'Bundy' DeFranco as Bundy
 Paul Anthony as Rough Stranger
 Kerri Kleiner as Allison's Friend
 Liz Reese as Telephone Montage
 Jennifer Foley as Amy
 Jon Cellini as the tough guy
 Joe Crusco as the Police Officer

Reception
On Rotten Tomatoes the film has an approval rating of 20% based on reviews from 5 critics.

Nathan Rabin of The A.V. Club called it "really boring in an extremely earnest fashion." Rabin warned that it "is not, as its box would somewhat dishonestly indicate, a Jennifer Love Hewitt vehicle. It is, instead, a laughless, irritatingly earnest comedy-drama about ..." the characters played by Mihok and Facinelli. Rabin said Hewitt and Lillard have little more than cameos but credits Lillard for giving the film what little spark it has.

Kathleen Craughwell of The L.A. Times said it "is pleasant enough and the production values are as good as any studio film. But the characters and what happens to them...just aren't as interesting as these actors, and their audience, deserve."

References

External links
 

1998 films
American romantic comedy-drama films
1990s English-language films
1998 romantic comedy-drama films
CineTel Films films
1998 comedy films
1998 drama films
1990s American films